Eggert Gíslason Þorsteinsson (6 July 1925 – 9 May 1995) was an Icelandic politician. He was the minister for social affairs from August 1965 to July 1970.

External links 

 Non auto-biography of Eggert Gíslason Þorsteinsson on the parliament website

1925 births
1995 deaths
Eggert Gislason Thorsteinsson